Karel Pravoslav Sádlo (5 September 1898 in Prague, Bohemia – 24 August 1971 in Prague, Czechoslovakia) was a Czech cellist and significant cello pedagogue.

Between 1929–1961, he was the teacher of the majority of Czech cellists and tutored a large number of leading soloists and chamber music performers (e.g. Milos Sadlo, Josef Chuchro, František Smetana, František Sláma, Antonín Kohout). He was a teacher at the Conservatoire, dean of the Faculty of Music of the Academy of Performing Arts in Prague and a juror at prestigious performers' competitions.

His music publishing (Edition Sádlo, since 1928) as well as his new way of playing the cello (his book on cello technique was published in 1925) had a lasting influence on the development of modern Czech music.

References

External links
 František Sláma Archive: Karel Pravoslav Sádlo in documents and reminiscences. The first Prague Spring International Cello Competition in 1950 in photographs, documents and reminiscences.

1898 births
Czech classical cellists
Czech music educators
1971 deaths
20th-century classical musicians
Musicians from Prague
20th-century cellists